The 2000 Prix de l'Arc de Triomphe was a horse race held at Longchamp on Sunday 1 October 2000. It was the 79th running of the Prix de l'Arc de Triomphe.

The winner was Sinndar, a three-year-old colt trained in Ireland by John Oxx. The winning jockey was Johnny Murtagh.

Race details
 Sponsor: Groupe Lucien Barrière
 Purse: 10,500,000 F; First prize: 6,000,000 F
 Going: Good
 Distance: 2,400 metres
 Number of runners: 10
 Winner's time: 2m 25.8s

 Abbreviation: nk = neck

Winner's details
Further details of the winner, Sinndar.
 Sex: Colt
 Foaled: 27 February 1997
 Country: Ireland
 Sire: Grand Lodge; Dam: Sinntara (Lashkari)
 Owner / Breeder: HH Aga Khan IV

References

External links
 Colour Chart – Arc 2000

Prix de l'Arc de Triomphe
 2000
Prix de l'Arc de Triomphe
Prix de l'Arc de Triomphe
Prix de l'Arc de Triomphe